Serbia made its Paralympic Games début at the 2008 Summer Paralympics in Beijing, following its split with Montenegro. It had previously competed as part of Serbia and Montenegro in 2004; and as part of Yugoslavia before that.

Serbia made its Winter Paralympics début at the 2010 Winter Paralympics in Vancouver.

Serbian athletes have won a total of 16 Paralympic medals, of which five gold, seven silver and four bronze medals.

Medal Tables

Medals by Summer Games

Medals by Winter Games

Medals per sport

Medalists

Multiple medal winners
This is a list of people who have won two or more Olympic medals, who represented Serbia as an independent country at least once.

Flagbearers

Old countries

See also
 Serbia at the Olympics

References